Mercury, also known as Advanced Vortex,  was a series of three United States spy satellites launched in the 1990s.  These satellites were launched and operated by the National Reconnaissance Office with the participation of the United States Air Force.  Two of the three launches from Cape Canaveral were successful, with the third failing to achieve orbit.  The satellites collect SIGINT from near-geosynchronous orbits.  Their precise mission and capabilities are highly classified, but they are widely believed to be successors to the Vortex/Chalet satellites.

The last launch attempt, on 12 August 1998 failed, with the USD $700–800 million satellite and the $344 million Titan IV(401)A launch vehicle exploding over the Atlantic Ocean. The failure was caused by a short circuit in the guidance system, which lost power and reset, causing the vehicle to pitch over. This in turn led to premature separation of one of the SRBs, which automatically self-destructed. The resulting explosion also destroyed the core vehicle, and the second SRB then initiated its own self-destruction. Roughly 4 seconds later the Range Safety Officer also issued a self-destruct signal to the rocket. Observers estimate each spacecraft has a mass of 4,000–5,000 kg.

Launches

References

External links
Mercury ELINT at Encyclopedia Astronautica
Mercury/Advanced VORTEX from Federation of American Scientists
Video of the launch and destruction

Reconnaissance satellites of the United States
Signals intelligence satellites
Military equipment introduced in the 1990s